Brinkmann is a town located in the San Justo Department in the Province of Córdoba in central Argentina.

Provincial Route 1 connects Brinkmann with the rest of the Córdoba road network and continues north after passing through the Santa Fe Province under Provincial Route 23. A railway branch connects Brinkmann to the south with the city of San Francisco and to the north with the towns of Morteros and Suardi. It belongs to the most important "Dairy Basin" in the country, since most of its fields are dedicated to dairy production and the entire area is populated by dairy industries.

Twin towns
 Giaveno, Italy

References

Populated places in Córdoba Province, Argentina
Populated places established in 1892
1892 establishments in Argentina